The Face of Evil is the fourth serial of the 14th season of the British science fiction television series Doctor Who, which was first broadcast in four weekly parts on BBC1 from 1 to 22 January 1977. This serial marked the debut of Louise Jameson as companion Leela. It was also the first of three stories written for the series by Chris Boucher and the first of five directed by Pennant Roberts.

In the serial, the powerful split-personality computer Xoanon (played by Tom Baker, Rob Edwards, Pamela Salem, Anthony Frieze, and Roy Herrick) attempts to create two super races from the descendants of a human expedition with eugenics—the savage Sevateem, and the psychic Tesh. The Fourth Doctor (Baker) seeks to repair this personality fault.

The serial is generally well-received by reviewers, although Doctor Who fans consider it to be overshadowed by other stories in Season 14. It did, however, gain high ratings, with three episodes achieving over 11 million viewers on first screening.

Plot

The Fourth Doctor, travelling alone in the TARDIS, arrives on a jungle planet and encounters Leela, a savage from the local tribe, who denounces him as the Evil One of fable among her people. She has been exiled from her tribe, the Sevateem, for profaning their god Xoanon who is kept prisoner by the Evil One and his followers, the Tesh, beyond a black wall. He speaks to them through the tribe's shaman, Neeva.  The Doctor finds a sophisticated sonic disruptor, which creates the force field that keeps creatures from attacking the village. The Sevateem will launch an attack on the domain of the Tesh to free their god, led by the combative Andor who suspects Neeva of being a false prophet.

In Neeva's holy tent, the Doctor inspects the ancient tribal relics, artifacts from an Earth survey expedition. He finds a transceiver used by Neeva to hear the commands of Xoanon. It speaks with the Doctor's own voice, conveying exhilaration on hearing the Doctor that "At last we are here. At last I shall be free of us." The Doctor tells some of the tribe the Sevateem are the descendants of a “survey team” which left a Starfall Seven Earth colony ship.

The Doctor and Leela arrive at a clearing beyond which, carved into a mountain nearby, is a depiction of the Doctor's face.  The Doctor cannot recall why his likeness would be there. They notice a figure in a space suit in the “mouth” entrance and follow it through a projection of a wall. Beyond is a rocket, which the Doctor recalls as belonging to the Mordee Expedition, his memory of earlier events now returning. Xoanon has detected the Doctor nearby, and when he reaches the ship the god-creature is both ecstatic that "We are here" while also manically pledging that "We must destroy us." The Doctor and Leela meet three representatives of the Tesh, who serve and worship Xoanon. The Doctor deduces both Sevateem and Tesh are descendants of the same crew from the Mordee Expedition, with the Tesh (or technicians) involved in the same deadly eugenics exercise as the Sevateem (or survey team). The invisible creatures that attacked the Sevateem are part of the same deranged scheme: Xoanon is a computer, designed to think independently. The Doctor had once repaired Xoanon but forgot to wipe his personality print from the data core, leaving the computer with a split personality. The Doctor, speaking as Xoanon with the communicator, instructs Neeva to tell Calib, who is now tribal leader, to lead the Sevateem survivors through the face in the mountain. With Leela keeping guard and holding the Tesh at bay, the Doctor ventures into the computer room of the ship to confront Xoanon. When Xoanon refuses to shut itself down, it channels a vicious mental assault at the Doctor, causing him to collapse, while Xoanon booms: "Who am I?"

The Tesh come under attack from Calib, Tomas and the survivors of the Sevateem, who now reach the spaceship. This diverts the Tesh while the Doctor and Leela return to the computer room, where Xoanon briefly takes control of Leela's mind. Most of the Sevateem come under the telepathic control of the computer too. The Tesh and Sevateem converge on the computer room and interrupt the Doctor as he tries to repair Xoanon, realising the computer has now triggered the countdown to an atomic explosion. Elsewhere in the ship Neeva is alone but crazed, his faith in Xoanon shattered. The shaman uses the disruptor gun against one of the images of Xoanon/the Doctor projected through a wall. The ensuing blast kills Neeva but also interrupts Xoanon's control of its subjects, allowing the Doctor to resume and complete his repairs. Xoanon's circuits explode, knocking the Doctor out.

Two days later the Doctor wakes up to find himself aboard the spaceship in the care of Leela. She explains Xoanon has been quiet and he interprets this as success for his extraction experiment. They visit the computer room and find Xoanon's identity and sanity restored. The computer confirms it was running a eugenics experiment and thanks the Doctor for his repair work. The Doctor then contacts the survivors of the Tesh and Sevateem and tells them Xoanon is now cured and able to support their new society. Leela then jumps aboard the TARDIS despite the protests of the Doctor, initiating take-off.

Production
In early 1975 writer Chris Boucher submitted a storyline to the Doctor Who production office. Script editor Robert Holmes rejected the script as too short and unsuitable for the programme but was impressed by the imagination of the piece. He invited Boucher to work on another story, which was to be called The Prime Directive, based on an idea by Holmes and producer Philip Hinchcliffe about the breakdown of a society controlled by a central computer. A few months later in October 1975, Boucher delivered the story, now titled The Mentor Conspiracy. Over the next three months Boucher and Holmes worked on the script, retitling it The Tower of Imelo. Hinchcliffe also had some input coming up with the idea that the Doctor had visited the planet before, but his visit had had a negative impact. The episodic scripts were then officially commissioned on 27 January 1976.  As the script for the first episode arrived, the name had now changed to The Day God Went Mad. Hinchcliffe disliked the title, not due to religious connotations but more because it was out of keeping with other titles. Boucher later agreed that it was "pretentious".

With the final script delivered in May 1976, production at Ealing Studios began on 20 September with the closing scene of episode one the first to be filmed. This included a model shot of a mountain side which had the Doctor's face carved into it in the style of Mount Rushmore, an idea from Hinchcliffe. The Ealing filming involved scenes set in the alien jungle, which was originally to be recorded in a real forest, but after the success of the previous season's Planet of Evil, it was decided to create a jungle in the film studios.  Another filmed sequence for episode one included a scene where the Doctor threatens one of the tribesmen with a knife. Lead actor Tom Baker refused to threaten someone with a weapon and instead substituted it for a jelly baby, much to Hinchcliffe's annoyance who wasn't present at the day's filming. Episode one also introduced the character of Leela, who wasn't intended to be a new companion, but a one-off character with whom the Doctor would interact. The idea was to introduce the new companion in the final story of the season (which later became The Talons of Weng-Chiang) and feature two short-term "companions" in between. Abandoning this plan, the production team decided to make the feisty Leela the new companion instead, thus director Pennant Roberts set about auditioning 26 actresses for the role before finally settling on Louise Jameson. Jameson was surprised at the level of attention she received from the press and the subsequent male interest due to her wearing a skimpy leather costume (designed by John Bloomfield) in the series. The red contact lenses she wore (to turn her blue eyes brown) caused her great discomfort and she was unable to wear them for long periods.

By the time the story went into the television studios, the title of the serial had changed yet again to The Face of Evil.  The set designer for the serial was Austin Ruddy in his only Doctor Who outing. Hinchcliffe was impressed with the sets and considers him the best designer after Roger Murray-Leach. In episode three, several actors were employed to take on the voice of Xoanon, including Pamela Salem, who had also auditioned for the role of Leela and would then appear as a cast member in the following serial. Also among these voices was a young boy, Anthony Frieze who was a pupil at the school in which Pennant Roberts' wife worked. Recording for the four episodes at BBC Television Centre began in late September and continued until late October. The final work to be completed on the serial was dubbing in early December 1976.

Cast notes
Lloyd McGuire later played Generalleutnant Tendexter in the audio play The Architects of History (2012).  David Garfield, who played Neeva, played the alien Von Weich who headed the German troops held in the First World War zone in The War Games (1969).  Leslie Schofield also appeared in The War Games, in the role of Leroy.

Broadcast and reception

The story was repeated on BBC Four over the Christmas period 2015, with the four episodes shown over two nights, attracting viewing figures of 0.14m, 0.18m, 0.06m and 0.09m respectively.

Paul Cornell, Martin Day, and Keith Topping wrote of The Face of Evil in The Discontinuity Guide (1995), "A little masterpiece, often undeservedly forgotten by the weight of the surrounding stories. A magnificent cast shake every ounce of subtlety and invention from the script." In The Television Companion (1998), David J. Howe and Stephen James Walker praised the casting and use of the image of the Doctor's face, calling it "unsettling". While it was overall an "impressive tale that manages to intrigue and delight", they noted that the Tesh made "little impression" and the conclusion to the story was "somewhat unlikely". DVD Talk reviewer John Sinnott gave it four out of five stars, praising Baker as "charming and funny" but "not goofy as he is in some stories", describing Leela as a "great companion", and saying "this story in particular works well and has an interesting plot that unfolds nicely", praising its "quite subversive" commentary on religious fervour.

In Doctor Who: The Complete Guide, Mark Campbell awarded it three out of ten, describing it as "a clever story, boringly told. There's too much technobabble and the characters are unsympathetic." In 2010, Patrick Mulkern of Radio Times awarded it two stars out of five, calling it "tired and insipid: no tension, no fear factor... Instead leaden storytelling, uninvolving characters, underdeveloped psychodrama and a dearth of originality. We'd seen invisible monsters in alien jungles at least three times before and numerous computers running amok." He said it had "a handful of intriguing ideas but percolating through four episodes that are stagnant at best and for the most part knuckle-gnawingly dull. The entire production limps along. Even Dudley Simpson's music is uninspired, parping away in the background trying to lift one lifeless tract after another." He described Part Two as "arguably the most abysmally plotted episode of the 1970s so far" but two of the serial's cliffhangers were "saving graces" and he highly praised Jameson's performance, but observed a lack of chemistry between her and Tom Baker and criticised Baker, saying the serial "marks the moment when the egos of the fourth Doctor and of the programme’s emboldened star become untethered". He also said director Pennant Roberts made "an inauspicious debut and [was] incapable of massaging any life into these scripts".

In 2010, Charlie Jane Anders of io9 listed the cliffhanger to the first episode — in which the Doctor's face is revealed to be that of the Evil One — as one of the greatest cliffhangers in the history of Doctor Who.

Commercial releases

In print

A novelisation of this serial, written by Terrance Dicks, was published by Target Books in January 1978.  The novel explains (as the teleplay does not) that the Doctor's earlier intervention took place very shortly after his previous regeneration (the face on the mountain is clearly modeled after the Fourth Doctor.)  At that time he was confused and disoriented, which explains both his mistakes and his forgetting having made them until forcibly reminded.

Home media
The story was released on VHS in May 1999 and on DVD on 5 March 2012.

References

External links

Target novelisation

Fourth Doctor serials
Doctor Who serials novelised by Terrance Dicks
1977 British television episodes